Walker is a city in Livingston Parish, Louisiana, United States. As of the 2010 census the population was placed at 6,138 (up 28% over the past decade), making Walker and Denham Springs the only parish municipalities classified as cities.

History
The area now known as Walker was founded by Michael Joseph Milton, Jr. (1795-1863) and “several slaves” in 1825. Michael Milton married in 1832 in Livingston Parish. He and his wife, Martha Clark Milton (1803-1878) developed 343 acres from a Land Grant for his service in the War of 1812. The Milton family was a pioneering family from North Carolina who settled an area in Alabama, before establishing the new community in the piney woods east of the Amite River and Denham Springs. In this sense, Walker, Louisiana, by virtue of its establishment, traces its roots to the founding of the nation in Jamestown, Virginia. The Federal government recognized the growth of the settlement and opened a post office as Milton Old Field in 1856. Michael Milton was appointed as postmaster in 1858. In 1890, the post office was renamed after Dr. William Elliott Walker, M.D., a legislator from nearby Springfield, who had also served as a lieutenant colonel in the Confederate States of America.

Walker became a city in 2011, by proclamation of Louisiana Governor Bobby Jindal.

Geography
Walker is located at  (30.489423, -90.862872). According to the United States Census Bureau, the city has a total area of 5.8 square miles (14.9 km), all land.

The city is located roughly 20 miles east of Baton Rouge, the Louisiana State Capitol.

Demographics

As of the 2020 United States census, there were 6,374 people, 2,449 households, and 1,557 families residing in the city.

According to the 2010 census, there were 6,138 people, 2,297 households, and 1,693 families residing in the city. The racial makeup of the city was 85.2% White, 10.8% African American, 0.3% Native American, 0.07% Asian, 1.6% from other races, and 1.4% from two or more races. Hispanic or Latino of any race were 2.9% of the population.

There were 1,758 households, out of which 39.6% had children under the age of 18 living with them, 59.4% were married couples living together, 11.1% had a female householder with no husband present, and 24.9% were non-families. 21.3% of all households were made up of individuals, and 8.5% had someone living alone who was 65 years of age or older. The average household size was 2.73 and the average family size was 3.18. 

In the town the population was spread out, with 29.8% under the age of 18, 9.7% from 18 to 24, 31.4% from 25 to 44, 19.5% from 45 to 64, and 9.6% who were 65 years of age or older. The median age was 32 years. For every 100 females, there were 97.9 males. For every 100 females age 18 and over, there were 91.6 males. The median income for a household in the town was $38,298, and the median income for a family was $43,750. Males had a median income of $32,907 versus $21,775 for females. The per capita income for the town was $16,056. About 5.9% of families and 9.6% of the population were below the poverty line, including 5.8% of those under age 18 and 20.6% of those age 65 or over.

Education
Walker is within the Livingston Parish Public Schools system.

The Livingston Parish Literacy and Technology Center in Walker is named for Sally Clausen, former Louisiana commissioner of education, and her brother, Thomas G. Clausen, state education superintendent from 1984 to 1988.

Notable people
 Jefferson D. Hughes, III, associate justice of the Louisiana Supreme Court since 2013, Walker resident
 Mike DeJean, Former Major League Pitcher, grew up in Walker and graduated from Walker High School.
 Julie Cantrell, editor and best-selling novelist, attended K-12 in Walker.

References

External links
 City of Walker

Cities in Louisiana
Cities in Livingston Parish, Louisiana
Cities in the Baton Rouge metropolitan area